Kréintgeshaff is a small settlement near Sandweiler in the Commune of Contern in Luxembourg. It is located directly North-East of the Contern-Sandweiler Industrial zone and located adjacent to the E29 Main Road. The settlement is surrounded by small tracks and streams.

The settlement gets no public buses however school Buses running from the Local Ecole Um Ewent Contern run directly to and from Kréintgeshaff every day.

References 

Sandweiler
Contern
Populated places in Luxembourg